
Year 556 (DLVI) was a leap year starting on Saturday (link will display the full calendar) of the Julian calendar. The denomination 556 for this year has been used since the early medieval period, when the Anno Domini calendar era became the prevalent method in Europe for naming years.

Events 
 By place 

 Europe 
 King Chlothar I suppresses a revolt of the Saxons and Thuringii in Saxony (Germany). For some time he exacts a tribute of 500 cows every year.

 Britain 
 King Cynric and his son Ceawlin of Wessex fight against the Britons at Beranburh, now identified as Barbury Castle (Wiltshire) in South West England.

 Persia 
 Lazic War: A Byzantine expeditionary force under Justin retakes Archaeopolis (modern Georgia), and routs the Persian army.
 Siege of Phasis: The Persians are defeated at the besieged town of Phasis in Lazica, held by the Byzantines.
 King Khosrau I opens negotiations with Justinian I, leading to the establishment of a 50 year peace agreement in 562.

 By topic 

 Religion 
 April 16 – The diplomatic representative (apocrisiarius) to Constantinople is elected as Pope Pelagius I, succeeding Vigilius as the 60th pope of Rome.

Births 
 Gao Bainian, crown prince of Northern Qi (d. 564)
Amr Ibn Hashim, Arab pagan chieftain, and biggest enemy to the spread of early Islam

Deaths 
 February 22 – Maximianus, Bishop of Ravenna (b. 499)
 Echu Tirmcharna, king of Connacht (Ireland)
 Erzhu Ying'e, empress of Northern Wei
 Romanos the Melodist, Syrian poet (approximate date)
 Xiao Yuanming, emperor of the Liang Dynasty 
 Yuwen Tai, general of Western Wei (b. 507)

References

Sources